Salvatore Farina (10 January 1846 – 15 December 1918) was an Italian novelist whose style of sentimental humor has been compared to that of Charles Dickens.
He was nominated for the Nobel Prize in Literature three times.

Life
Born in the Sardinian town of Sorso, he studied law at Turin and Pavia before moving to Milan and taking up literature, remaining there for the rest of his life.
The late nineteenth century English novelist George Gissing thought that his novella Si Muore, read by him in January 1890, was 'far more interesting than I expected; in fact excellently written'.

Works 

 Il tesoro di Donnina (1873)
 Amore bendato (1875)
 Capelli biondi (1876)
 Mio figlio! (1877-1881)
 Si Muore: L'ultima battaglia di Prete Agostino (1886)
 Frutti proibiti
 Un tiranno al bagni di mare
 Cuore e blasone
 Due amori
 Amore ha cento occhi
 Per la vita e per la morte
 La mia giornata, a trilogy:
 Dall'alba al meriggio (1910)
 Care ombre (1913)
 Dal meriggio al tramonto (1915)

References
 Convegno Salvatore Farina: la figura e il ruolo a 150 anni dalla nascita (1996 : Sorso, Italy)

Notes

External links 
 
 
 Farina page, with picture (in Italian)

1846 births
1918 deaths
People from Sorso
Italian male writers
Sardinian literature